A lollipop is a confectionery product.

Lollipop(s), Lollypop or Lolly Pop may also refer to:

People
Lollipop (actress) (1970–2008), Italian pornographic actress
Lollipop (wrestler) (born 1979), a.k.a. Jaime Lynne, American professional wrestler
Lolly Pop (born 1975), American solo dance-pop artist
Lollypop Jones (1897–1954), American vaudeville entertainer

Arts, entertainment, and media

Music

Groups
Lollipop (Italian band), an Italian girl group
Die Lollipops (The Lollipops), a German children's band
Lollipop F, formerly Lollipop, a Taiwanese Mandopop boy band

Albums
Lollipop (album), a 2011 album by the Meat Puppets
Lollipop (single album), a 2016 single album by Imfact
Die Lollipops, an album by the group Die Lollipops

Songs
"Lollipop" (1958 song), a popular song first recorded by Ronald & Ruby, also covered by The Chordettes
"Lollipop" (Big Bang and 2NE1 song), 2009
"Lollipop" (Eldzhey and Morgenshtern song), 2020
"Lollipop" (f(x) song), 2011
"Lollipop" (Lil Wayne song), 2008
"Lollipop" (Mika song), 2007
"Lollipop (Candyman)", a 1997 song by Aqua
"Lollipop (Param Pam Pam)", a 2009 song by Alexandra Stan
"Lollipop", a song by BoA from 2004 Summer Vacation in SMTown.com
"Lollipop", a song by DADA (Matt Schwartz)
"Lollipop", a song by Kumi Koda from Gossip Candy
"Lollipop", a song by LL Cool J from 10
"Lollipop", a song by Snoop Dogg from Paid tha Cost to Be da Bo$$
"Lollipop", a song by Luther Campbell from Somethin' Nasty

Other arts, entertainment, and media
Lollipop (film), a 2008 Indian film
 Lollipop (musical), a 1924 Broadway musical

Computing and technology
Android Lollipop, version 5.x of Google's mobile operating system
Lollipop sequence numbering, a numbering scheme used in routing protocols
Lollipop, the name of the symbol (⊸), used to represent linear implication in Linear logic

Other uses
Chicken lollipop, an hors d'oeuvre
Crossing guard, often described in the United Kingdom and Australia as a lollipop lady/man
Lollipop coral, species of tunicate Nephtheis fascicularis

See also
Lollipopaia, a genus of fungi
Lolly (disambiguation)